The women's shot put event at the 1999 Summer Universiade was held at the Estadio Son Moix in Palma de Mallorca, Spain on 8 July.

Results

References

Athletics at the 1999 Summer Universiade
1999 in women's athletics
1999